Papyrus Oxyrhynchus 57 (P. Oxy. 57) is a letter relating to a peculation by a treasury official, written in Greek. The manuscript was written on papyrus in the form of a sheet. It was discovered by Grenfell and Hunt in 1897 in Oxyrhynchus. The document was written between 195-196 CE. It is housed at Johns Hopkins University. The text was published by Grenfell and Hunt in 1898.

The letter was addressed to Apion, ex-strategus of the Antaeopolite nome, with request for the payment of a sum of money left unpaid by one of Apion's former subordinates. It was written by Aurelius Apolinarius, a strategus of the Oxyrhynchus nome. The measurements of the fragment are 270 by 91 mm.

See also 
 Oxyrhynchus Papyri
 Papyrus Oxyrhynchus 56
 Papyrus Oxyrhynchus 58

References 

057
2nd-century manuscripts